Cross Purposes is a 1916 American short drama silent black and white film directed by William Worthington and written by Bess Meredyth. It was produced by Rex Motion Picture Company and distributed by Universal Film Manufacturing Company.

Cast
 Jessie Arnold as Lisa
 Jack Connolly as John Standing
William Canfield as The Grand Duke

References

External links
 

Films directed by William Worthington
Films with screenplays by Bess Meredyth
American silent short films
1916 short films
Silent American drama films
1916 drama films
1916 films
Universal Pictures short films
1910s American films